Stocchi is an Italian surname. Notable people with the surname include:

Achille Stocchi, 19th-century Italian sculptor
John Stocchi (born 1937), South African Olympic rower
Luca Stocchi (born 1991), Italian footballer
Vittore Stocchi (1895–1987), Italian Olympic rower

Italian-language surnames